Ambrose Chapel is a historic Methodist chapel located at Stotlers Crossroads, Morgan County, West Virginia.  The land was deeded for a free meeting house for anyone who preached the gospel of Jesus Christ, in 1797 by (William) Henry Ambrose.  The original building was a log structure and was later replaced.  The current Chapel was built in 1851 and is a -story rectangular building with hewn log framing, stone foundation, clapboard siding, and metal roof.  Also on the property is a cemetery with over 300 burials dating from the early 19th century to about 1945. During the American Civil War it was used as a Confederate field hospital in January, 1862 during Stonewall Jackson's Bath Romney Campaign.

It was listed on the National Register of Historic Places in 1998.

References

External links
 
 

1851 establishments in Virginia
19th-century Methodist church buildings in the United States
American Civil War hospitals
American Civil War sites in West Virginia
Cemeteries on the National Register of Historic Places in West Virginia
Churches completed in 1851
Churches in Morgan County, West Virginia
Churches on the National Register of Historic Places in West Virginia
Log buildings and structures on the National Register of Historic Places in West Virginia
Methodist cemeteries
Methodist churches in West Virginia
Morgan County, West Virginia in the American Civil War
National Register of Historic Places in Morgan County, West Virginia
Wooden churches in West Virginia